Johnsons Corners is an unincorporated community in Wayne County, in the U.S. state of Ohio.

History
Johnsons Corners was named for Abner Johnson, the original owner of the town site. A variant name was Amwell. A post office called Amwell was established in 1861, and remained in operation until 1883.

References

Unincorporated communities in Wayne County, Ohio
Unincorporated communities in Ohio